Provincial Trunk Highway 83A (PTH 83A) is a name for a numbered highway in Manitoba, Canada serving the town of Swan River.  The highway is an alternate route of PTH 83; the southern leg of the route was the original alignment of the parent highway.

Route Description

PTH 83A branches off from PTH 83 south of Swan River, becoming Centennial Drive once it enters the town limits. The highway then turns right on to Main Street southwest of the town centre and meets PTH 10A (4th Ave.) about 40 metres later (the original northbound terminus for PTH 83 was at this intersection).  The two highways run in concurrence through the town centre along Main Street until they terminate at PTH 10 and the current northbound terminus for PTH 83.  On the route, the speed limit is mainly 50 km/h, and 80 km/h approaching PTH 83 on the south side.

External links 
Manitoba Official Map - West Central

083A